The Soueast DX3 is a subcompact crossover designed by Pininfarina and manufactured by Chinese automaker Soueast Motors.

Overview

The Soueast DX3 was launched during the 2016 Beijing Auto Show, while the production version of the DX3 crossover debuted on the 2016 Chengdu Auto Show with the official market launch in November 2016. 

There are two engines originated from Mitsubishi available including a 1.5 liter engine producing 120hp and 143nm, and a 1.5 liter turbo engine with 150hp and 220nm. The 1.5 liter is mated to a five-speed manual gearbox, while the 1.5 liter turbo engine is mated to a CVT. Pricing ranges from 72,900 yuan to 99,900 yuan. An electric version called the DX3 EV400 is also available launched on the Chinese car market in November 2017. The price including subsidies of the DX3 EV will start from around $17,000.

Soueast DX3X 
A sportier trim was available in 2018 named the Soueast DX3X, featuring a black mask in the front fascia and minor styling changes.

References

External links 

 Soueast DX3 website
 Soueast DX3 EV400 website
 
DX3
Crossover sport utility vehicles
All-wheel-drive vehicles
Front-wheel-drive vehicles
2010s cars
Cars introduced in 2016
Cars of China